Lord Blackburn may refer to 
Colin Blackburn, Baron Blackburn (1813–1896)
John Morley, 1st Viscount Morley of Blackburn (1838–1923)
Adam Patel, Baron Patel of Blackburn (1940-2019)
Robert Blackburn, Lord Blackburn, Scottish lawyer and judge, Senator of the College of Justice 1918–35